Osvaldo Ronc (born 16 November 1947) is an Italian ski mountaineer.

Together with Renzo Meynet and Mirko Stangalino, he placed first in the civilian team category in the 1975 Trofeo Mezzalama edition, which was carried out as the first World Championship of Skimountaineering.

References 

1947 births
Living people
Italian male ski mountaineers
World ski mountaineering champions